Provanna is a genus of sea snails, marine gastropod mollusks in the family Provannidae.

The species was named after Dall's first wife.

This is a very old genus with species already existing in Cretaceous seep deposits off Japan (93 - 100 million years ago). The Caribbean and the Pacific fauna were isolated about 3 million years ago by the closure of the Central American Isthmus.

Description
The apical whorls of the protoconch are lacking through decollation. The opening is then sealed with a calcareous plug. The sculpture of the ovate fusiform shell shows scattered sigmoidal axial ribs that are crossed by spiral cords. The whorls are broad.

Habitat
They are common in hydrothermal vents, hydrocarbon cold seeps and (more rarely) on deep-water food-falls, depending on the species. Most species feed on filamentous bacteria, while others feed on detritus.

Species

Species within the genus Provanna include:

 Provanna abyssalis Okutani & Fujikura, 2002
 Provanna admetoides Warén & Ponder, 1991
 † Provanna alexi Amano & Little, 2014 
 † Provanna antiqua Squires, 1995 
 † Provanna azurini Kiel, Aguilar & Kase, 2020
 Provanna beebei Linse, Nye, Copley & C. Chen, 2019
 Provanna buccinoides Warén & Bouchet, 1993
 Provanna chevalieri Warén & Bouchet, 2009
 Provanna cingulata C. Chen, Watanabe & Ohara, 2018
 Provanna clathrata Sasaki, Ogura, Watanabe & Fujikura, 2016
 Provanna cooki Linse, Nye, Copley & C. Chen, 2019
 Provanna fenestrata C. Chen, Watanabe & Sasaki, 2019
 † Provanna fortis Hybertsen & Kiel, 2018 
 Provanna glabra Okutani, Tsuchida & Fujikura, 1992
 Provanna goniata Warén & Bouchet, 1986
 † Provanna hirokoae Amano & Little, 2014
 Provanna ios Warén & Bouchet, 1986
 Provanna kuroshimensis Sasaki, Ogura, Watanabe & Fujikura, 2016
 Provanna laevis Warén & Ponder, 1991
 Provanna lomana (Dall, 1918)
 Provanna lucida Sasaki, Ogura, Watanabe & Fujikura, 2016
 Provanna macleani Warén & Bouchet, 1989
 † Provanna marshalli Saether, Little & K. A. Campbell, 2010
 Provanna muricata Warén & Bouchet, 1986
 † Provanna nakagawaensis Kaim, Jenkins & Hikida, 2009
 Provanna nassariaeformis Okutani, 1990
 Provanna pacifica (Dall, 1908)
 † Provanna pelada Kiel, Hybertsen, Hyžný & Klompmaker, 2019 
 Provanna reticulata Warén & Bouchet, 2009
 Provanna sculpta Warén & Ponder, 1991
 Provanna segonzaci Warén & Ponder, 1991
 Provanna shinkaiae Okutani & Fujikura, 2002
 Provanna stephanos C. Chen, Watanabe & Sasaki, 2019
 Provanna subglabra Sasaki, Ogura, Watanabe & Fujikura, 2016 
† Provanna tappuensis Kaim, Jenkins & Warén, 2008 
† Provanna urahoroensis Amano & Jenkins, 2013 
 Provanna variabilis Warén & Bouchet, 1986

Several fossil species have been described, predominantly identified from hydrocarbon seep deposits (Saether et al., 2010), including:
 Provanna antiqua Squires & Goedert, 1995 
 Provanna marshalli Saether, Little & Campbell, 2010
 Provanna nakagawaensis Kaim, Jenkins & Hikida, 2009
 Provanna tappuensis Kaim, Jenkins & Warén, 2008

There also are several fossil species known, but not formally described and named, from Central America, Japan, and possibly the Philippines (see Saether et al., 2010).
Species brought into synonymy
  Provanna marianensis Okutani & Fujikura, 1990: synonym of  Desbruyeresia marianensis (Okutani & Fujikura, 1990)

References

 Healy,  J. M.  1990. Taxonomic affinities of the deep-sea  genus Provanna:  new evidence from sperm structure; J. Molluscan Stud.  56: 119-122 
 Warén, A. & Bouchet, P. (1993). New records, species, genera, and a new family of gastropods from hydrothermal vents and hydrocarbon seeps. Zoologica Scripta. 22: 1-90.
 Spencer, H.G., Marshall, B.A. & Willan, R.C. 2009 Recent Mollusca. pp 196–219 in: Gordon, D.P. (Ed.), The New Zealand inventory of biodiversity. 1. Kingdom Animalia: Radiata, Lophotrochozoa, Deuterostomia. Canterbury University Press, Christchurch
 Saether, K.P., Little, C.T.S. & Campbell, K.A. (2010) A new fossil provannid gastropod from Miocene hydrocarbon seep deposits, East Coast Basin, North Island, New Zealand. Acta Palaeontologica Polonica 55, 507–517.

External links
 Dall, W. H. (1918). Description of new species of shells, chiefly from Magdalena Bay, Lower California. Proceedings of the Biological Society of Washington. 31: 5-8
 Sasaki T., Ogura T., Watanabe H.K. & Fujikura K. (2016). Four new species of Provanna (Gastropoda: Provannidae) from vents and a seep off Nansei-shoto area, southwestern Japan. Venus. 74 (1-2): 1-17

 
Provannidae